Blessed salt has been used in various forms throughout the history of Christianity. Among early Christians, the savoring of blessed salt often took place along with baptism. In the fourth century, Augustine of Hippo named these practices "visible forms of invisible grace". However, its modern use as a sacramental remains mostly limited to its use with holy water within the Anglican Communion and Roman Catholic Church.

History
In addition,  "tells the story of the prophet Elisha pouring salt onto Jericho's water springs."

For centuries since the advent of Jesus, salt that had been cleansed and sanctified by special exorcisms and prayers was given to catechumens before entering the church for baptism. According to the fifth canon of the Third Council of Carthage in the third century, salt was administered to the catechumens several times a year, a process attested by Augustine of Hippo (Confessions I.11). Two specific rites, namely a cross traced on the forehead and a taste of blessed salt, not only marked the entrance into the catechumenate, but were repeated regularly. By his own account, Augustine was "blessed regularly with the Sign of the Cross and was seasoned with God's salt." 

Early in the sixth century, John the Deacon also explained the use of blessed salt, "so the mind which is drenched and weakened by the waves of this world is held steady". Salt continued to be customarily used during the scrutinies of catechumens or the baptism of infants.

Current use
In recent times, the use of blessed salt is found within some Catholic and Anglican liturgies of Holy Baptism, and in the blessing of holy water, sometimes called lustral water. The Anglican Missal, used by some Anglo-Catholics, in The Order of Blessing Water, includes an English translation of traditional prayers for the exorcism and blessing of salt. The Collect reads:

In the section on Occasional Offices of the Book of Common Prayer, the following prayer, given under the rite for Blessing of Holy Water is said before the holy water is blessed and "salt is put into the water in the form of a cross":

The Roman Rite of the Catholic Church also mentions use of blessed salt. The 1962 Rituale Romanum includes salt as component in three rites:

Baptism: Before the candidates enter the church or baptistry, salt is blessed with an exorcism, and a pinch can be put in the mouth of the candidates. However, in modern practice this can be skipped.
Reconsecration of an altar: In one rite for the reconsecration of an altar which has been disturbed, salt is exorcized, blessed, and mixed with ashes, water and wine, the resulting mixture being used to make the mortar with which the altar is resealed.
Blessing holy water: Salt is added to water in silence after a prayer in which God is asked to bless the salt, recalling the blessed salt "scattered over the water by the prophet Elisha" and invoking the protective powers of salt and water, that they may "drive away the power of evil".

An additional rite provides for the blessing of salt for animals.

Blessed salt is also used in prayer services of Pentecostal churches, such as the Apostolic Church Fullness of God's Throne in Brasil.

Salt as sacramental
Salt may also be blessed for use as a sacramental, using the same prayer as is used during the preparation of holy water. This salt may be sprinkled in a room, or across a threshold, or in other places as an invocation of divine protection. This will keep demons and possessed persons away from a home and crossing a line made of salt. It may also be consumed.

References

Further reading

 The Roman Ritual (Rituale Romanum), Vol 2: Christian Burial, Exorcism, Reserved Blessings. Reprint: Boonville, New York: Preserving Christian Publications, 2007.

Catholic liturgy
Christian religious objects
Sacramentals
Edible salt